Douglas Emerson (born October 4, 1974) is an American former child actor who played Scott Scanlon on Beverly Hills, 90210 in the show's first and second seasons and played Eddie Beckner in The Blob.

On Beverly Hills 90210, Emerson's character Scott was a nerdy freshman and best friends with David Silver, played by Brian Austin Green. As David became increasingly close with the show's core popular group the Scott/David friendship suffered. In the second season, Emerson was no longer a full-time character but only a special guest star. His character killed himself at his birthday party, when he twirled a gun around and accidentally shot himself as David looked on in horror.

After his departure from the show, Emerson enrolled in junior college and in 1993 transferred to Pepperdine University. There he met his future wife, Emily Barth. The pair married after he dropped out to join the U.S. Air Force in 1996. As of 2002, he was a staff sergeant and was stationed at Holloman AFB in New Mexico. He earned a dozen awards for, among other accomplishments, planning missions during the 1999 Kosovo War. He left the Air Force in 2003, at which time he was living in Denver with his wife and their two daughters, Hayley and Hannah.

Filmography

References

External links

1974 births
20th-century American male actors
American male child actors
American male film actors
American male television actors
Living people
Male actors from California
People from Glendale, California
United States Air Force personnel of the Kosovo War